The Untitled Bob Marley film is an upcoming American biographical drama film about the life of singer and songwriter Bob Marley. Directed by Reinaldo Marcus Green, and written by Zach Baylin, Frank E. Flowers, and Terence Winter, the film is scheduled to be released by Paramount Pictures. The film stars Kingsley Ben-Adir as Bob Marley, alongside Lashana Lynch.

Cast
 Kingsley Ben-Adir as Bob Marley
 Lashana Lynch as Rita Marley

Additionally, Michael Gandolfini, Nadine Marshall, James Norton, and Anthony Welsh were cast in undisclosed roles.

Production
In March 2021, it was announced that a biographical drama film based on the life of singer and songwriter Bob Marley was in development by Paramount Pictures. Reinaldo Marcus Green had been hired to direct, and with Zach Baylin, Frank E. Flowers, and Terence Winter writing the screenplay.

In February 2022, Kingsley Ben-Adir was cast as the titular character, after an extensive, yearlong and globe-spanning search by the studio. In August, Lashana Lynch had joined the cast playing as Bob's wife Rita Marley. 

In February 2023, Michael Gandolfini, Nadine Marshall, James Norton, and Anthony Welsh had joined the cast in undisclosed roles.

Filming
Principal photography began in December 2022, in London.

Release
The untitled Bob Marley film is scheduled to be released in the United States on January 12, 2024.

References

External links
 

Upcoming films
2024 films
2020s American films
2020s English-language films
2020s historical films
2020s musical drama films
American biographical drama films
American historical films
American musical drama films
Bob Marley
Upcoming English-language films
English-language films
Films set in the 1970s
Cultural depictions of Bob Marley